The 2010 Malaysia Cup (Malay: Piala Malaysia 2010) was the 84th edition of the Malaysia Cup. The competition began on 14 September 2010 and concluded on 30 October 2010 with the final, held at National Stadium, Bukit Jalil. A total of 16 teams took part in the competition. The teams were divided into 4 groups of 4 teams. The group leaders and runners-up teams in the groups after 6 matches qualified to the quarterfinals.

Qualifications

Only 16 teams qualified for the 2010 edition of the Malaysia Cup; 12 teams from Malaysia Super League and 4 teams from Malaysia Premier League. The teams were:-
 
 Malaysia Super League

  Selangor
  Kelantan FA
  Terengganu FA
  Johor FC
  PBDKT T-Team FC
  Kedah FA
  Negeri Sembilan FA
  Pahang FA
  KL PLUS FC
  Kuala Lumpur FA
  Perak FA
  Perlis FA

 Malaysia Premier League

  Felda United FC
  Sabah FA
  PKNS FC
  ATM FA

Group stage

Group A

First leg

Second leg

Group B

First leg

Second leg

Group C

First leg

Second leg

Group D

First leg

Second leg

Knockout stage

Bracket

 Aggregate 2–2. Johor FC won on away-goal rules.

Quarterfinals

First leg

Second leg

Semi-finals

First leg

Second leg

Final

Winners

References

2010
2010 domestic association football cups
Cup